Sanak is a 2021 Indian Hindi language action thriller film directed by Kanishk Varma and produced by Zee Studios and Sunshine Pictures. It stars Vidyut Jammwal, Rukmini Maitra, Neha Dhupia and Chandan Roy Sanyal. Principal photography began in January 2021. The film was released digitally on 15 October 2021 on Disney+ Hotstar.

Plot 
Vivaan Ahuja, a skilled MMA trainer, learns that his wife Anshika Maitra's heart can stop at any time and an operation is required. The operation is successful. As she recovers in the hospital, a terrorist group led by Saju Solanki attack the hospital to retrieve their illegal arms dealer and leader Ajay Pal Singh, who was actually responsible for the deaths of 18 Indian Army soldiers due to his supply of faulty weapons and was moved to the hospital for emergency surgery after his pacemaker was tampered with in prison. The hospital patients are taken hostage, including Anshika, while Ajay is unconscious under anaesthesia after his surgery. ACP Jayati Bhargav and her team are tasked to free the hostages.

Vivaan, who is just leaving after visiting Anishka is in the hospital basement, oblivious to the invasion until he is attacked by one of the terrorists, where he manages to kill him. Shocked, he takes the black pouch belonging to the terrorist, which contains a walkie talkie and a remote detonator and sneaks back into the hospital. Vivaan meets a hospital guard named Riyaz and a child named Zubin who had been hiding, and befriends them. Meanwhile, Jayati is stunned to see that her daughter Aanya is being used by the terrorists, strapped to a bomb. Saju blackmails her, saying that he will blow up the hospital unless she supplies a chopper and a bus to them. Jayathi agrees, but secretly plans to attack them.

Vivaan learns the hospital's layout with Riyaz's help and plans to attack the hospital's control room so that Saju can't see him coming. He is attacked again but with Zubin's help, he kills the terrorist. The bodies of both terrorists are found and Saju orders Vivaan to be killed. Vivaan manages to contact Jayati intermittently and inform her about Saju. He continues to kill and evade the terrorists stationed around each floor and is finally able to take control of the control room with Riyaz and Zubin. Vivan frees the patients held hostage on the ground floor. Saju, who is on the ninth floor realizes that Vivaan is related to one of the hostages and tries to figure out who it is. Unable to do so, Saju kills a nurse to force Vivaan out of hiding. Ajay wakes up and they plan for their escape.

Vivaan realizes during a conversation with Riyaz that Saju was lying to the police; he was never going to use the bus and chopper he had demanded but rather escape through the sixth floor. He is actually planning to blow up the stairs and the elevator in order to erase evidence by killing the hostages. Vivaan relays this to Jayati, who decides to trust him and play by his information. She and her team enter the hospital where they free Aanya and deactivates the bomb. Vivaan kills Saju's accomplice and finally defeats Saju. Saju is eventually killed after the falling elevator collapses on him, and Jayati shoots Ajay to death. Jayati thanks Vivaan for his help, remarking that he should be given a medal for his work but respects his wish to keep his identity away from media.

Cast 

 Vidyut Jammwal as Vivaan Ahuja
 Rukmini Maitra as Anshika Maitra, Vivaan's wife
 Neha Dhupia as ACP Jayati Bhargav
 Chandan Roy Sanyal as Saju Solanki
 Chandan Roy as Riyaz Ahmed Motlekar
 Kiran Karmarkar as Ajay Pal Singh
 Sunil Kumar Palwal as Raman
 Daniele Balconi as Yuri
 Ivy Haralson as Taira
 Alois Knapps as Maksym
 Du Tran Au as Chad
 Harminder Singh Alag as Zubin
 Adrija Sinha as Aanya Bhargav, Jayathi's daughter
 Neha Pednekar as Anuradha
 Tanguy Guinchard as Gunnar
 Sefa Demirbus as Jesper
 Felix Fukoyoshi as Andy
 Dimitri Vujicic as KP
 Shreyal Shetty as Pasha
 Sanjay Kulkarni as Police Officer Godbole
 Karthikesh as Parma
 Asif Ali Beg as Dr. Pajwani
 Arjun Ramesh as Aditya
 Sudhanva Deshpande as Dr. Sinha
 Karan Verma aa Raghav Chaturvedi
 Anand Alkunte as ASP Rakesh Jadhav

Reception

Critical response
Sanak received mixed reviews from critics and audience.

Bollywood Hungama gave the film a rating of 2.5 stars out of 5 and wrote, "Vidyut Jammwal starrer Sanak majorly rests on Vidyut Jammwal's presence and the novel and exciting action scenes."
Shubhra Gupta of The Indian Express gave Sanak a rating of 3 out of 5 stars and wrote, "Sanak should have been more like a non-stop ride but it is still sparkling because of the stylish and exciting action sequences".
Archika Khurana of The Times of India gave 3 out of 5 stars and said: "Overall, Vidyut Jammwal's slick kicks, punches and backflips raise the stakes of this action-packed drama."
Udita Jhunjhunwala of Firstpost gave the film 2.5 out of 5 stars and wrote, "Sanak over-emphasizes the action, leaving the story and the emotional core under-developed." 
Shubham Kulkarni, from Koimoi gave 2.5 out of 5 stars and wrote, "Vidyut Jammwal is the biggest reason to watch Sanak, but cannot be the only attention-grabbing point of the feature length film.

Soundtrack 

The film's music was composed by Chirantan Bhatt and Jeet Gannguli while lyrics written by Sameer Anjaan, Manoj Yadav and Rashmi Virag.

The song "O Yaara Dil Lagana" is a remake of the song of same name from the 1996 film Agni Sakshi sung by Kavita Krishnamurthy, composed by Nadeem–Shravan and written by Sameer Anjaan.

References

External links 
 

Indian action thriller films
2021 action thriller films
Films set in hospitals
Indian medical television series
Films scored by Jeet Ganguly
Healthcare in India
Mixed martial arts films
Martial arts in India
Films about terrorism in India
Films scored by Chirantan Bhatt
Disney+ Hotstar original films
Hindi-language Disney+ Hotstar original programming